Ekaterina Fyodorovna Ilina (born 7 March 1991) is a Russian handball player for HBC CSKA Moscow and the Russian national team.

Individual awards  
 Team of the Tournament Center Back of the Baia Mare Champions Trophy: 2014
All star center back of the Møbelringen Cup 2015 in Norway
MVP of Russian Super League 20/21

References

External links

1991 births
Living people
Sportspeople from Tolyatti
Russian female handball players
Olympic handball players of Russia
Olympic medalists in handball
Olympic gold medalists for Russia
Medalists at the 2016 Summer Olympics
Medalists at the 2020 Summer Olympics
Handball players at the 2016 Summer Olympics
Handball players at the 2020 Summer Olympics
Olympic silver medalists for the Russian Olympic Committee athletes